The 2020–21 Holy Cross Crusaders men's ice hockey season was the 57th season of play for the program, the 23rd at the Division I level, and the 18th season in the Atlantic Hockey conference. The Crusaders represented the College of the Holy Cross and were coached by David Berard, in his 7th season.

The start of the college hockey season was delayed due to the ongoing coronavirus pandemic. As a result, Holy Cross's first scheduled game was in mid-November as opposed to early-October, which was the norm.

Season
Despite several COVID-related changes to the schedule, Holy Cross began the season well, winning 4 of their first 6 games and sat near the top of the conference in early December with a 4–1 mark in Atlantic Hockey play. The team added a series against Quinnipiac just before Christmas and the two losses seemed to reverse the Crusaders' fortunes. Holy Cross lost all of their remaining games with the offense being dormant for most of those contests. In their final 10 matches, Holy Cross scored just 10 goals and were shut out 4 times. With their schedule being rearranged in February, the Crusaders played only two games in the entire month and sat at the bottom of their conference when the Atlantic Hockey tournament was set to begin.

Four days before they were to play Sacred Heart in the first round, Holy Cross received a positive Covid test and immediately suspended all team activities. This caused the team to withdraw from the conference tournament and cancel the remainder of their season.

Erkka Vänskä sat out for the season.

Departures

Recruiting

Roster

As of August 31, 2020.

Standings

Schedule and Results

|-
!colspan=12 style=";" | Regular Season

|-
!colspan=12 style=";" | 
|- align="center" bgcolor="#e0e0e0"
|colspan=12|Participation Cancelled

Scoring statistics

Goaltending statistics

Rankings

USCHO did not release a poll in week 20.

Awards and honors

References

2020–21
2020–21 Atlantic Hockey men's ice hockey season
2020–21 NCAA Division I men's ice hockey by team
2020–21 in American ice hockey by team
2021 in sports in Massachusetts
2020 in sports in Massachusetts